All of Us is an American sitcom that premiered on UPN network on September 16, 2003. The series aired on UPN for its first three seasons, airing its final episode on UPN on May 15, 2006. On October 1, 2006, the show moved to The CW, a new network formed by the merger of UPN and The WB, where it aired for fourth and final season; the last episode aired on May 14, 2007, and the series was cancelled by The CW on May 15, 2007.  Warner Bros. Television produced this series. A total of 88 episodes aired over the four seasons.

Series overview

Episodes

Season 1 (2003–04)

Season 2 (2004–05)

Season 3 (2005–06)

Season 4 (2006–07)

References

External links
 
 

All of Us